Camaná is a province in the Arequipa Region, Peru. It borders the provinces of Caravelí, Condesuyos, Castilla, Caylloma, Arequipa and Islay.

The province was struck by the 2001 southern Peru earthquake, which occurred on June 23, 2001.

Political division
The province is divided into eight districts (Spanish: distritos, singular: distrito):

 Camaná (Camaná)
 José María Quimper (El Cardo)
 Mariano Nicolás Valcárcel (Urasqui)
 Mariscal Cáceres (San José)
 Nicolás de Piérola (San Gregorio)
 Ocoña (Ocoña)
 Quilca (Quilca)
 Samuel Pastor (La Pampa)

Ethnic groups 
The province is inhabited by indigenous citizens of Quechua descent. Spanish is the language which the majority of the population (84.02%) learnt to speak in childhood, 13.30% of the residents started speaking using the Quechua language and 2.57% using Aymara (2007 Peru Census).

See also 
 Wamp'uy

Sources 

Provinces of the Arequipa Region